Kevin Hughes (born August 6, 1988) is a former American football offensive tackle. He played college football at Southeastern Louisiana University and attended Amite High School in Amite City, Louisiana. He has been a member of the St. Louis Rams, San Diego Chargers, Green Bay Packers, Carolina Panthers and New England Patriots of the National Football League.

Professional career

St. Louis Rams
Hughes signed with the St. Louis Rams July 29, 2011. He was released by the Rams on September 3 and signed to the team's practice squad on September 4, 2011. He played in three games for the Rams in 2011. Hughes was released by the Rams on August 27, 2012.

San Diego Chargers
Hughes was signed to the San Diego Chargers' practice squad on November 21, 2012.

Green Bay Packers
Hughes signed with the Green Bay Packers on February 6, 2013. He was released by the Packers on August 31, 2013.

Carolina Panthers
Hughes was signed by the Carolina Panthers on January 3, 2014. He was waived/injured by the Panthers on August 30, 2014. He was placed on injured reserve by the Panthers on August 31, 2014. Hughes was released by the Panthers on March 10, 2015.

New England Patriots
Hughes signed with the New England Patriots on May 11, 2015. He was waived/injured by the Patriots on August 3, 2015. On August 4, 2015, he cleared waivers and was placed on injured reserve.

References

External links
Just Sports Stats
NFL Draft Scout

Living people
1988 births
Players of American football from New Orleans
American football offensive tackles
African-American players of American football
Southeastern Louisiana Lions football players
St. Louis Rams players
21st-century African-American sportspeople
20th-century African-American people